Pocket Ninjas is a 1994 action film starring Robert Z'Dar, Richard Rabago, and Gary Daniels. Based on a screenplay by Mark Williams, the film was directed by Donald G. Jackson, David Huey, and Dave Eddy.

Development
Pocket Ninjas was originally entitled Skate Dragons and the original screenplay was by Mark Williams. The film was made by Cine Excel Entertainment, who also made Future War. The film was intended to be a children's version of The Roller Blade Seven that would showcase Jacksons' "Roller Cam" cinematography and "Zen Film-making" style. However, Jackson was replaced when executive producer Huey felt the "Zen Film-making" style was not working. Eddy was brought in to create a wrap around for the Jackson and Huey footage.

Release history
Pocket Ninjas was first released to the foreign markets in 1994. It was released on VHS in the United States in 1997 by Screen Pix Home Video. The DVD was released by Simitar Entertainment in 1999 and re-released by Universal Music and Video Distribution in 2004.

References

External links
 
 
 parody/comedy Review at Somethingawful.com
 Review at wearemoviegeeks.com

American children's films
1994 films
1990s action films
American independent films
American martial arts films
1994 martial arts films
1990s English-language films
Films directed by Donald G. Jackson
1990s American films